Albert Jacquard (23 December 1925 – 11 September 2013) was a French geneticist, popularizer of science and essayist.

He was well known for defending ideas related to science, degrowth, needy persons and the environment. He was 10 years an active member of the French communist party (PCF).

Beginnings 

He was born in Lyon to a catholic and conservative family from the region of Franche-Comté (east of France). At the age of nine, he was disfigured after a car accident in which his brother died. In 1943, he earned two baccalaureates in mathematics and philosophy. In 1948, he earned a master's degree in public factory engineering from the French École Polytechnique and joined the French Institute of statistics.

High-level civil servant 

In 1951, he entered the French tobacco monopoly SEITA (which merged with its Spanish counterpart Tabacalera to form Altadis in 1999) as an organisation and method engineer. Then, he worked as a rapporteur in the French Court of Financial Auditor (equivalent to the US Government Accountability Office) and as a senior executive in the French Health ministry. 
In 1966, he went to Stanford University to study population genetics as a Research worker. Back in France in 1968, he joined French Institute for Demographic Studies as supervisor of the genetics department. 
In 1973, he was appointed expert in genetics in the World Health Organisation. He retired in 1985.

University professor 

While he was still working in the World Health Organization, he taught as visiting professor at several universities such as the University of Geneva in Switzerland (1973–1976), Pierre and Marie Curie University in Paris (1978–1990) or the Catholic University of Louvain in Belgium (1979–1981). 
As a recognition for his work, he was awarded the French Légion d'honneur, the French Ordre national du Mérite and the Fondation de France scientific medal.

Ethical and political involvement 

While he was part of the French Consultative Committee of Ethics (Comité consultatif national d'éthique) in the early 1990s, he took a strong stand against commercial use of the human genome.

He was very close to the anti-globalization movement and regularly came to the defense of illegal immigrants and homeless people in France.

He wrote several books to expose his views and share his experience with new generations.
He made a variety of public statements in favor of choosing Esperanto as a universal second language in contradiction to tendencies in Europe to use English as a second language.

Bibliography

Scientific work
Structure génétique des populations, Masson, 1970
Les probabilités, Collection Que sais-je ?, Presses universitaires de France, 1974
Génétique des populations humaines, Presses universitaires de France, 1974
The Genetic Structure of Populations, Springer, 1974
L'Étude des isolats. Espoirs et limites, Presse universitaires de France-INED, 1976
Concepts en génétique des populations, Masson, 1977

Popular science (in French)
Éloge de la différence, Éditions du Seuil, 1978
Moi et les autres, Éditions du Seuil, 1983
Au péril de la science ?, Éditions du Seuil, 1984
 Inventer l'homme, Éditions Complexe, 1984
L'Héritage de la liberté, Éditions     du Seuil, 1986
Cinq milliards d'hommes dans un vaisseau, Éditions du Seuil, 1987
Moi, je viens d'où ?, Éditions du Seuil, 1988
Abécédaire de l'ambiguïté, Éditions du Seuil, 1989
C'est quoi l'intelligence ?, Éditions du Seuil, 1989
Idées vécues, Flammarion, 1990
Voici le temps du monde fini, Éditions du Seuil, 1991
Tous différents, tous pareils, Éditions Nathan, 1991
Comme un cri du cœur, Éditions l'Essentiel, 1992 (collective work)
La Légende de la vie, Flammarion, 1992
E=CM2, Éditions du Seuil, 1993
Deux sacrés grumeaux d'étoile, Éditions de la Nacelle, octobre 1993
Science et croyances, Éditions Écriture, mars 1994
Absolu, dialogue avec l'abbé Pierre, Éditions du Seuil, 1994
L'Explosion démographique, Flammarion, collection « Dominos », 1994
La Matière et la vie, Éditions Milan, coll. « Les essentiels », 1995
La Légende de demain, Flammarion, 1997
L'Équation du nénuphar, Calmann-Lévy, 1998
L'avenir n'est pas écrit, (with Axel Kahn), Bayard, 2001
Paroles citoyennes, (with Alix Domergue), Albin Michel, 2001
La Science à l'usage des non-scientifiques, 2001
De l'angoisse à l'espoir, (with Cristiana Spinedi), Calmann Lévy, 2002

Political and philosophical work (in French)
Un monde sans prisons ?, Éditions du Seuil, 1993
J'accuse l'économie triomphante, Calmann-Lévy, 1996
Le Souci des pauvres. L'Héritage de François d'Assise, Calmann-Lévy, 1996
Petite philosophie à l'usage des non philosophes, Québec-Livres, 1997
Le Souci des pauvres, 1998
A toi qui n'est pas encore né, 1998 
Dieu ?, Stock, 2003 (https://www.editions-stock.fr/livres/essais-documents/dieu-9782234048348)
Tentative de lucidité,Stock, 2003 (archives des chroniques, https://www.editions-stock.fr/livres/essais-documents/tentatives-de-lucidite-9782234056510).
Halte aux Jeux !, Stock, 2004 (https://www.editions-stock.fr/livres/essais-documents/halte-aux-jeux-9782234056923)
Nouvelle petite philosophie, Stock, 2005 (https://www.editions-stock.fr/livres/essais-documents/nouvelle-petite-philosophie-9782234058064).
Mon utopie, Stock, 2006 (https://www.editions-stock.fr/livres/essais-documents/mon-utopie-9782234059405).
Jamais soumis, jamais soumise (dialogue with Fadela Amara), Stock, 2007 (https://www.editions-stock.fr/livres/essais-documents/jamais-soumis-jamais-soumise-9782234059863).

References

External links 

 Un entretien de Jacques Languirand avec Albert Jacquard

1925 births
2013 deaths
École Polytechnique alumni
Stanford University alumni
Academic staff of the University of Paris
French biologists
French geneticists
French humanists
Anti-globalization activists
Degrowth advocates
Officiers of the Légion d'honneur
Scientists from Lyon